The Adolphe Merkle Institute (AMI) is a research center in Fribourg, Switzerland focused on nanoscience. The institute is named after the Swiss entrepreneur Adolphe Merkle who created the foundation that partially funded the institute.

History
Dr. Adolphe Merkle, an entrepreneur from Fribourg, established the Adolphe Merkle Foundation in 2007 with the goal of strengthening research and teaching at the University of Fribourg. His contribution of 100 million Swiss francs constitutes one of the most important private donations to support academic research in Switzerland.

In 2008, the Adolphe Merkle Institute was founded under its first director, Prof. Peter Schurtenberger, formerly a professor in the Department of Physics at the University of Fribourg and then appointed as the chair of Experimental Physics and Nanoscience at the Institute.  He developed the vision of an interdisciplinary institute that focuses on soft nanomaterials and combines fundamental and application-oriented research. In 2010, Prof. Christoph Weder, who joined AMI as the chair for Polymer Chemistry and Materials in 2009, became director, serving until April 2022. The institute appointed Professors Alke Fink and Barbara Rothen-Rutishauser as co-chairs of BioNanomaterials and Michael Mayer as Professor of Biophysics. Prof. Schurtenberger left the institute to establish a new group at the University of Lund, and Ullrich Steiner was appointed as Professor of Soft Matter Physics. Steiner took over as institute director in May 2022.

Since 2014, AMI is located on the University of Fribourg's Pérolles campus. The Institute is housed in two renovated buildings that were previously a private clinic and an additional modern construction.

Structure
AMI is an interdisciplinary research center, focused on fundamental and application-oriented research in soft nano- and materials sciences.

The institute is headed by an executive director and executive board, who report to a scientific advisory board and institute council. Administrative structures are said to be kept lean and AMI employs an industry liaison and technology transfer office for partners from industry and academia, dedicated personnel for EU project proposals and a communications officer.

50% of AMI staff are doctoral students and 20% postdoctoral researchers.

The emphasis on interdisciplinarity is also reflected in how the research groups are constituted. They do not adhere to the traditional distinction of fields in the natural sciences but rather have interdisciplinary topics as their research focus.

The principal investigators of the research groups have full professorships at the University of Fribourg's faculty of science. They teach at the Master's level but have a decreased teaching load in order to dedicate more time towards research activities at AMI.

Current Research Groups
Polymer Chemistry & Materials (Prof. Christoph Weder)
BioNanomaterials (Prof. Alke Fink and Prof. Barbara Rothen-Rutishauser)
Biophysics (Prof. Michael Mayer)
Soft Matter Physics (Prof. Ullrich Steiner)

Former Research Groups
Soft Nanoscience 2008-2010 (Prof. Peter Schurtenberger)
Nanoparticle Self-Assembly 2012-2017 (Prof. Marco Lattuada)
Macromolecular Chemistry 2013-2018 (Prof. Nico Bruns)

Research Activities

AMI's research revolves around soft nanomaterials, such as such as nanoparticles, colloids, polymers, nanostructures, and nanopores, and emphasizes bio-inspired materials design, stimuli-responsive materials, optical materials, energy materials, sensing, the detection of nanoparticles in complex media, and the investigation of the interactions of nanomaterials with biological systems.

The Polymer Chemistry & Materials group is conducting research on stimuli-responsive or smart polymers, supramolecular systems, bio-inspired materials, nanocomposites, and polymer mechanochemistry.

The BioNanomaterials group's research focuses on bioprinting, hazard assessment of nanomaterials, nanoparticle analysis and nanobiomechanics.

The BioPhysics group's research includes nanopores for single molecule analysis, bio-inspired voltage generation and pore forming peptides.

The Soft Matter Physics group is investigating and manufacturing nanostructured materials made by polymer self-assembly, energy materials for solar cells and batteries, photonic and plasmonic effects arising from structured materials, bio-inspired materials and surfaces.

In 2017 the institute had 33 active research projects. Topics of investigation include color-generation in insects, the effect of graphene on human lungs, bio-inspired drug delivery, record-breaking perovskite solar cells, and electric eel-inspired energy devices.

Education
For the master's students there is a strong early focus on 'hands-on' work in the AMI laboratories as well as the opportunity to join one of the research groups for their master's thesis.

In 2015 AMI launched an interdisciplinary master's program at the interface of Physics, Chemistry, and Biology that emphasizes bio-inspired materials.

A summer internship program for undergraduate students from universities in other European countries or The United States is also present and is run in collaboration with the National Center of Competence in Research (NCCR) Bio-Inspired Materials of the Swiss National Science Foundation (SNF).

Collaborations
AMI is conducting both fundamental as well as application-oriented research in the field of soft nanomaterials, receiving part of its funding through industrial partnerships. In 2018 AMI spawned its first startup NanoLockin.

NCCR Bio-Inspired Materials
AMI is involved with and headquarters the National Center of Competence in Research Bio-Inspired Materials, an interdisciplinary center for research and education around materials inspired by nature.

Partnerships for International Research and Education (PIRE)
PIRE is a collaboration between AMI, Case Western Reserve University, the University of Delaware, the University of Chicago, and the University of California at San Diego. The program is funded by the National Science Foundations of Switzerland and the US. Its focus lies on developing functional materials inspired by desirable substances in nature.

Plant-inspired Materials and Surfaces (PlaMatSu) 
The European Commission is funding PlaMatSu as an Innovative Training Network (ITN) under the Horizon 2020 Marie Sklodowska-Curie Actions with nine PhD students at University of Fribourg (Switzerland) and AMI, University of Freiburg (Germany), and University of Cambridge. As industrial partners the ITN includes BASF SE (Germany),  Fischerwerke GmbH & Co. KG (Germany), and Dr. Tillwich GmbH (Germany), as well as VDI - The Association of German Engineers and Wikimedia CH as communication partners.

CityCare
CityCare is another ITN funded by the European Commission under the Horizon 2020 Marie Sklodowska-Curie Actions with three PhD students. The projects investigates the damaging effects of air pollutants on the skin.

PATROLS
PATROLS (Physiologically Anchored Tools for Realistic nanOmateriaL hazard aSsessment) is an international project funded by the European Union through the Horizon 2020 research and innovation program with the objective to develop tools and techniques to predict potential hazards for humans and the environment from engineered nanomaterials in order to minimize the necessity of animal testing and categorize nanomaterials according to their health and safety risks.

See also
 University of Fribourg
 Fribourg

References

External links
 Adolphe Merkle Institute
 Université de Fribourg

Research institutes in Switzerland
University of Fribourg
2008 establishments in Switzerland